Chandrapaul Hemraj (born 3 September 1993) is a Guyanese cricketer. He made his first-class debut for Guyana in the 2011–12 Regional Four Day Competition on 16 March 2012. He made his List A debut for Guyana in the 2017–18 Regional Super50 on 31 January 2018. He made his Twenty20 debut for St Lucia Stars in the 2018 Caribbean Premier League on 16 August 2018.

In October 2018, he was named in the West Indies' One Day International (ODI) squad for series against India. He made his ODI debut for the West Indies against India on 21 October 2018.

In October 2019, he was named in Guyana's squad for the 2019–20 Regional Super50 tournament. In July 2020, he was named in the Guyana Amazon Warriors squad for the 2020 Caribbean Premier League. In June 2021, he was selected to take part in the Minor League Cricket tournament in the United States following the players' draft.

References

External links
 

1993 births
Living people
West Indies One Day International cricketers
Guyanese cricketers
Guyana cricketers
Saint Lucia Kings cricketers
Place of birth missing (living people)